BEYE (Binary EYE) is a multiplatform, portable viewer of binary files with a built-in editor that functions in binary, hexadecimal and disassembler modes. It uses native Intel syntax for disassembly. Features include an AVR/Java/x86-i386-AMD64/ARM-XScale/PPC64 disassemblers, a Russian code pages converter, full preview of MZ, NE, PE, NLM, COFF32, ELF formats, partial preview of a.out, LE and LX, Phar Lap formats, and a code navigator.

History
The program was created in 1994 under the name View. In February 2010 it was renamed Beye, even though poll votes were mostly against its rename.  The author stated, that the previous name "had some negative associations in English" and the new one "doesn't conflict with other projects".

At that time, compilers were not able to produce highly optimized executables, and CPUs were not as efficient. That caused many programmers to code in assembly language. In those days many countries, including Russia, had no Internet access and it was problematic to find information about CPUs. Many programs produced errors and it was too difficult to understand the true source of the problems. The compiler might be defective, or the program might have design defects or oversights.

After spending a long time trying to understand the causes of the defects in his own programs, the author of beye coded his own disassembler. Perhaps the needs of the author could have been covered by existing disassemblers, but it was impossible to get them, and so he wrote his own. The author of beye was familiar with some disassemblers, like hiew and qview. But these covered only half of the author's needs. When the project achieved the functionality of hiew, the author started redistributing his project to friends.

Initially beye was closed-source, but friends helped to improve the project with new ideas, and in some cases with new code. Later, after purchasing a modem, the author decided to open the source and publish beye on the Internet. The author understood that commercial profit from selling executables of beye would be too low to make much money. On the other hand, attracting volunteers would permit serious improvements of the project.

In 2000, the sources were published at SourceForge.

Beye no longer works in Windows 11.

Features
Beye's features include:
 Built-in AVR/Java/x86-i386-AMD64/ARM-XScale/PPC64 disassemblers.
 Saving and restoring parts of files.
 Support for a-out, arch, coff-386, ELF, MZ, jvmclass, LMF, LE and LX, NE, NLM-386, PharLap, PE, RDOFF, SIS and SISX executable formats.
 Instruction high-lighting.
 A code navigator.
 A CPU performance utility
 A built-in 64-bit calculator
 Support for the formats: ASF, AVI, BMP, JPEG, mov, MP3, MPEG, RealMedia, WAV multimedia.
 Console-Input viewer
 Pattern searching in different modes: disassembler, hexadecimal and binary.
 Russian code-page converter.

See also
Hex editor
Reverse engineering
Comparison of hex-editors
Hiew

Notes

References

External links

Free editing software
Free software testing tools
Hex editors